This is a list of fighter aces in World War II from Australia. An "ace" is generally considered to be any pilot who has downed five or more enemy aircraft, though the term has never been officially adopted by the Royal Australian Air Force (RAAF). Accordingly, the numbers of victories attained by its fighter pilots were not routinely publicised by the RAAF during the war. Historians have gleaned figures from combat reports, unit histories, personnel records, and award citations, which sometimes recorded the pilot’s tally of victories at the time the decoration was recommended. The top-scoring Australian ace of World War II, Clive Caldwell, is generally credited with 28½ victories, that is 27 solo "kills" and three shared, or a total of 30 if shared victories are counted as one each. His total was almost twice that of the second-highest scoring Australian ace, Adrian Goldsmith with 17.

For aces of other countries, see List of World War II aces by country.

Notes

References
 
 
 
 
 

Australia
 
World War II flying aces